Phaneta bimaculata is a species of moth of the family Tortricidae. It is found in China (Jiangxi), Japan and the Russian Far East.

References

Moths described in 1966
Eucosmini
Moths of Asia